Downtown East is an official neighborhood in Minneapolis, Minnesota, United States. Within Downtown East is the Mill District, which contains former industrial buildings left over from the days when Minneapolis was the flour milling capital of the world. Many of these old mills and factories are being converted to housing, bringing a residential population to a neighborhood that beforehand didn't have many residents. Because of this, the Mill District in Downtown East is one of the fastest growing areas of the city.

Its boundaries are the Mississippi River to the north, Interstate 35W to the east, 5th Street South to the south, and Portland Avenue to the west. It is bounded by the Downtown West, Elliot Park, and Cedar-Riverside neighborhoods. The Marcy-Holmes neighborhood is on the other side of the river, but there is no direct automobile connection between the two neighborhoods. There is a pedestrian and bicycle connection via the Stone Arch Bridge. Downtown East was home to the Hubert H. Humphrey Metrodome, where the Minnesota Twins (MLB baseball), Minnesota Vikings (NFL football), and Minnesota Gophers (NCAA University of Minnesota football) have all played home games.  As of 2009, the Minnesota Golden Gophers moved into the new TCF Bank Stadium on the University of Minnesota Campus.  Additionally, the Minnesota Twins moved into new Target Field at the start of the 2010 season. In 2016, U.S. Bank Stadium opened on the Metrodome's former site.

The neighborhood is also home to the Mill City Museum, Mill Ruins Park, Gold Medal Park and the Guthrie Theater complex, which abandoned its old location near Loring Park during the summer of 2006.

The neighborhood is served by U.S. Bank Stadium Station of the METRO light rail system.

References

External links
Minneapolis Neighborhood Profile - Downtown East
7th Ward, City of Minneapolis
Downtown Minneapolis Neighborhood Association

Neighborhoods in Minneapolis
Minnesota populated places on the Mississippi River